The 670s decade ran from January 1, 670, to December 31, 679.

Significant people

、

References

Sources